Collita chinensis is a moth of the family Erebidae. It is found in Mongolia and China (Shensi, Shaanxi, Heilongjang).

The wingspan is 37–39 mm. The forewings are yellowish grey with a paler costal streak. The hindwings are paler.

References

Moths described in 1954
Lithosiina